Virgibacillus profundi is a Gram-variable, moderately halophilic, endospore-forming and motile bacterium from the genus of Virgibacillus.

References

Bacillaceae
Bacteria described in 2018